Chichas District is one of eight districts of the province Condesuyos in Peru.

Places of interest 
 Solimana

References